Hemileccinum is a genus of fungi in the family Boletaceae. It was erected in 2008 by Josef Šutara to contain two species united by a number of shared morphological features: H. depilatum and the type H. impolitum. In 2014, Wu et al. found it to be distinct from other bolete genera in a molecular phylogenetic study and found it to be most closely related to Corneroboletus. In 2015, H. subglabripes was transferred to Hemileccinum from Boletus based on DNA evidence, while subsequent studies further confirmed the monophyly of the genus.

Morphological Features of Xerocomoid Boletes

References 

Boletaceae
Boletales genera